Nishita Goswami is an Indian actress who works in Assamese language films. She has acted in a number of Assamese films and stage dramas.

Personal life
Goswami is Assamese and is the daughter of actress Moloya Goswami and Pradip Goswami. She hails from Guwahati. She married Sayan Chakravarty, a Bengali computer engineer and businessman from Shillong in 2011.

Career
Goswami debuted as a child artist with her first film Prem Rati Phula Phool and as a lead role in the film Mon in Assamese in 2002 and in Bengali in 2003 (opposite Ravi Sarma and Kopil Bora), which was considered to be as her first Bengali film. The movie was very successful and she became the star of the Assamese cinema.

After Mon, she acted several theater films as well as VCD films like Rong, Kadambari, Collie, Suren Suror Putek, Adhinayak, Monjai, Dhan Kuberor Dhan etc.

Filmography

Awards and nominations

Filmfare awards (Assamese)

References

External links

Indian film actresses
Indian television actresses
Actresses in Assamese cinema
Actresses in Assamese television
Living people
Kendriya Vidyalaya alumni
21st-century Indian actresses
Actresses from Guwahati
Year of birth missing (living people)
Assamese people